Bewcastle Castle is a ruined castle in the parish of Bewcastle in the English county of Cumbria, a few miles from the Scottish border.

History
The first castle was built on the site of Bewcastle Roman Fort, around 1092. The castle is surrounded by a dry moat, the north and east sections of which re-use the Roman ditch. The castle was destroyed in 1173, but was rebuilt towards the end of the 14th century. It was decayed by the early 15th century when Edward IV granted it to his brother, the Duke of Gloucester, later to become King Richard III. The buildings were repaired and the gatehouse was possibly added at this time. From the late 15th century, the castle was held by the Musgrave family. In 1602 Thomas Musgrave was accused by Lancelot Carleton to the Privy Council of harbouring thieves in the castle . They fought a duel at Canonbie Holm to settle the issue.

Bewcastle Castle was reputedly destroyed by Cromwell in 1641. The castle was in a state of ruin by the 17th century, and although much of the stone was removed for nearby buildings, much of the gatehouse with its internal garderobe still remains.

The element "castle" in the place-name Bewcastle probably refers to the Roman fort within which it was built, giving rise to the unusual repetition of the word in the castle name. However, the Ordnance Survey gives the name as Bew Castle.

Gallery

See also
Castles in Great Britain and Ireland
List of castles in England

References

Sources
Fry, Plantagenet Somerset, The David & Charles Book of Castles, David & Charles, 1980.

External links 

Castles in Cumbria
Ruins in Cumbria
Ruined castles in England